Rıza Yıldırım (born May 6, 1987) is a European champion Turkish wrestler competing in the 97 kg division of freestyle wrestling. He is a member of Bursa Büyükşehir Belediyesi Spor Kulübü.

Yıldırım won the gold medal in the 96 kg division at the 2013 Mediterranean Games in Mersin, Turkey. He became champion at the 2017 European Wrestling Championships held in Novi Sad, Serbia.

References

External links
 

Living people
1987 births
Place of birth missing (living people)
Turkish male sport wrestlers
Bursa Büyükşehir Belediyespor athletes
Competitors at the 2013 Mediterranean Games
Mediterranean Games gold medalists for Turkey
European champions for Turkey
Mediterranean Games medalists in wrestling
European Wrestling Championships medalists
21st-century Turkish people